VVV-WIT-07 is a unique variable star which presents a sequence of recurrent dimmings (Ks~14.35 – 16.164) with a possible deep eclipse in July 2012.

Overview
The star was found by the "Vista Variables in the Via Lactea" (VVV) project, which is a survey of European Southern Observatory (ESO) variability of the innermost bulge of the Milky Way galaxy. The near-infrared spectra of VVV-WIT-07 appear without features, without prominent emission or absorption lines. The characteristics found in the light curve of VVV-WIT-07 (WIT refers to "What Is This?") are similar to those seen in J1407 (Mamajek's Object), a pre-MS K5 dwarf with a ring system that eclipses the star or, alternatively, to Tabby's star, an F3 IV/V star that shows irregular and aperiodic obscurations in its light curve.

From 2010 to 2018, the star dimmed and brightened irregularly (v~14.35 – 16.164), and seemed similar to Tabby's star, except the light from VVV-WIT-07 dimmed by up to 80 percent, while Tabby’s star faded by only about 20 percent. Another star, J1407, however, has been found to have dimmed by up to 95%, which may be more similar to the light curve presented by VVV-WIT-07. Nonetheless, according to ESO astronomer Valentin Ivanov, "A key word that could be used to describe our finding [of VVV-WIT-07] is extreme. In every aspect ... We have identified a system that challenges the imagination even more than usual, because it is so unlike our own planetary system."

See also
 Disrupted planet
 List of stars that have unusual dimming periods

References

External links 
 , a presentation by Tabetha S. Boyajian (2016).
 , a presentation by Issac Arthur (2016).
 , star with unusual light fluctuations (2017).
 , up to 80% dimming.

 

Astronomical objects discovered in 2018
Scorpius (constellation)
2018 in science
Unsolved problems in astronomy